Turbonilla biangulata is a species of sea snail, a marine gastropod mollusk in the family Pyramidellidae, the pyrams and their allies.

Distribution
This marine species occurs in the northern Gulf of Thailand area.

References

 Robba E., Di Geronimo I., Chaimanee N., Negri M. P. & Sanfilippo R. (2004) Holocene and Recent shallow soft-bottom mollusks from the northern Gulf of Thailand area: Scaphopoda, Gastropoda, additions to Bivalvia. La Conchiglia, 309, supplement: 5-288.

External links
 To World Register of Marine Species

biangulata
Gastropods described in 2004